Kuck may refer to:

 David Kuck (born 1937), American computer scientist
 John Kuck (1905–1986), American athlete
 Jonathan Kuck (born 1990), American speed skater
 Wolfgang Kuck (born 1967), German volleyball player

See also
 Johnny Kucks (1933–2013), American baseball player